Lumberjack is a 1944 American Western film directed by Lesley Selander.

Cast 
William Boyd as Hopalong Cassidy
Andy Clyde as 'California' Carlson
Jimmy Rogers as Jimmy Rogers
Douglass Dumbrille as Daniel J. Keefer
Ellen Hall as Julie Peters Jordan
Francis McDonald as Clyde Fenwick
Ethel Wales as Aunt Abbey Peters
Hal Taliaferro as Henchman Taggart
Charles Morton as Big Joe Williams
Herbert Rawlinson as Buck Peters
Frances Morris as Mrs. Williams
John Whitney as Ben Jordan
Jack Rockwell as Sheriff Miles

Plot summary
Buck Peters (Herbert Rawlinson), the owner of the Bar-20 Ranch, tells Hoppy to stop his daughter, Julie, (Ellen Hall) from eloping. Hoppy is too late to stop the wedding, but he arrives in time to see Julie's husband murdered.

The widowed bride hires Hoppy to find her husband's murderer, and save her new home from land grabbers. While protecting Julie's High Sierras' land Hoppy must climb down a rope onto a dangerous log dam.

Soundtrack 
 "The Place Your Heart Calls Home" (Written by Ozie Waters and Forrest Johnson)

References

External links 

1944 films
1944 Western (genre) films
American black-and-white films
American Western (genre) films
Films set in forests
Hopalong Cassidy films
Films scored by Paul Sawtell
Films directed by Lesley Selander
1940s English-language films
1940s American films